Atractus taphorni is a species of snake in the family Colubridae. The species can be found in Venezuela.

References 

Atractus
Endemic fauna of Venezuela
Reptiles of Venezuela
Reptiles described in 2002